Ixalotriton parva, the dwarf false brook salamander, is a species of salamander in the family Plethodontidae. It is endemic to a small mountainous area of Mexico where its natural habitat is subtropical or tropical moist montane forests. It is threatened by habitat loss. There is some doubt whether this species should be classified as Pseudoeurycea parva or Ixalotriton parva.

Description
The dwarf false brook salamander is small with a broad head, small nostrils, protruding eyes and slender body. It is a greyish-brown colour with a pale brown stripe running along the ridge of the back and a few whitish spots on the tail, which is prehensile. In appearance it is very similar to Pseudoeurycea praecellens.

Distribution and habitat
It lives in virgin cloud forests and does not flourish after forestry operations have caused disturbance. It is a terrestrial species and is usually found in the water that collects in the centre of bromeliads.

Biology
The dwarf false brook salamander has been little studied but the female is believed to lay several eggs in a concealed site at the beginning of the dry season. She then guards the eggs until they hatch into juvenile salamanders at the start of the rainy season, bypassing the aqueous larval stage.

Status
The dwarf false brook salamander is considered "Critically Endangered" in the IUCN Red List of Threatened Species. It was last surveyed in 2007 and on that occasion, a single specimen was found.

References

Ixalotriton
Endemic amphibians of Mexico
Taxonomy articles created by Polbot
Taxobox binomials not recognized by IUCN